Tang K. Tang is a Taiwanese biomedical researcher.

Career
He holds a PhD in Human Genetics (1988) from Yale University, where he also completed postdoctoral research (1989).  Subsequently, he became a researcher at the Academia Sinica.  In 2022 Tang was elected a Member of the Academia Sinica, where he is a Distinguished Research Fellow at the Institute of Biomedical Sciences. 

He also is a member of the Program in Molecular Medicine, a collaboration between National Yang Ming Chiao Tung University and Academia Sinica.

He co-holds patents with Academia Sinica research colleagues.

References

External links
PubMed search for Tang K. Tang

Members of Academia Sinica
Living people
Year of birth missing (living people)

Yale University alumni
Taiwanese medical researchers
Molecular biologists
Cell biologists
Cancer researchers
Taiwanese geneticists
Taiwanese scientists